Astrup may refer to:

Places in Denmark
Astrup, Hjørring
Astrup, Mariagerfjord
Astrup, Ringkøbing-Skjern

Surname
Mette Marit Astrup (1760–1834), Danish actress
Nils Astrup (1778–1835), Norwegian politician
Hans Rasmus Astrup (1831–1898), Norwegian politician; government minister 1885–87
Thorvald Astrup (1876–1940), Norwegian architect
Nikolai Astrup (1880–1928), Norwegian artist, great-grandson of Nils Astrup
Poul Bjørndahl Astrup (1915–2000), Danish clinical chemist
Heidi Astrup (born 1972), Danish Olympic handball player
Nikolai Astrup (politician) (born 1978), Norwegian minister

See also